The Greek basketball league system is a number of interconnected competitions for professional basketball clubs in Greece. The system has a hierarchical format with a promotion and relegation system between competitions at different levels. There are several different competitions in the system. The highest level competitions are the nationwide competitions: the Greek Basket League, the Greek A2 Basket League, the Greek B Basket League, and the Greek C Basket League. Those competitions are followed by the regional level competitions: the A1, the A2, the B, the C, and/or the C1, and the C2 categories.

Competitions

Other competitions
Greek Cup

See also
League system
European professional club basketball system
Spanish basketball league system
Italian basketball league system
French basketball league system
Russian basketball league system
Turkish basketball league system
German basketball league system
Serbian basketball league system
Polish basketball league system
Hungarian basketball league system
South American professional club basketball system

References

External links
Eurobasket.com Greek Men's Basketball
Greek League Official Website
Greek Basketball Federation Official Website 

    
Basketball league systems